Miriam Gabriela Cárdenas de la Torre (born 27 January 1977) is a Mexican politician from the National Action Party. In 2009 she served as Deputy of the LX Legislature of the Mexican Congress representing Chihuahua.

References

1977 births
Living people
Politicians from Chihuahua (state)
Women members of the Chamber of Deputies (Mexico)
National Action Party (Mexico) politicians
21st-century Mexican politicians
21st-century Mexican women politicians
Deputies of the LX Legislature of Mexico
Members of the Chamber of Deputies (Mexico) for Chihuahua (state)